Coon Rapids is a northern suburb of Minneapolis, and is the largest city in Anoka County, Minnesota, United States.  The population was 63,599 at the 2020 census, making it the fifteenth largest city in Minnesota and the seventh largest Twin Cities suburb.

Geography
Recreational lakes in the city include Cenaiko Lake and Crooked Lake, two-thirds of which is in Coon Rapids. The other third is in the city of Andover, immediately to the north.

History
In 1835, the Red River Ox Cart Trail was laid to establish military and trade connections between Minneapolis and Anoka. The first industries of Coon Rapids sprung up around the road, including the prominent Anoka Pressed Brick and Terra Cotta Company, founded by Dr. D.C. Dunham in 1881. The clay excavation site – known locally as the “Clay Hole” – is one of the lasting reminders of Coon Rapids’ industrial history. Today, the vital Red River Ox Cart Trail is known as Coon Rapids Boulevard and remains an important commercial corridor for the city.

In 1912, construction began on the Coon Rapids Dam and the influx of laborers and engineers increased the city's population to over 1,000 for the first time. Completed in 1914, the dam functioned as a regional power source for the Northern States Power Company until it was sold to the Hennepin County Park Board in 1969 and incorporated into the Coon Rapids Dam Regional Park.

When the dam was built, Anoka Township renamed itself Coon Creek Rapids, later shortened to Coon Rapids. In 1959, the Village of Coon Rapids voted to incorporate as a city and the City of Coon Rapids was born. The city's population increased from 14,000 in 1959 to more than 63,385 in 2021, making it the 15th largest city in Minnesota.

Transportation

While commercial traffic on the Mississippi River once passed through Coon Rapids - steamboats could reach as far north as St. Cloud under certain conditions  the completion of the Coon Rapids Dam in 1914 established the city as the northernmost navigable point of the Mississippi river.

U.S. Highway 10 and Minnesota State Highways 47 and 610 are three of the main routes in the city.

Coon Rapids Riverdale Station is served by the Northstar Commuter Rail line connecting the northwest suburbs and downtown Minneapolis; the line opened in November 2009.

The Burlington Northern/Santa Fe mainline railroad from Seattle to Chicago travels directly through Coon Rapids, and the commuter rail runs on these tracks.

Economy
Coon Rapids is home to the headquarters of medical device manufacturer RMS Company, healthcare and housing provider, Mary T, Inc., furniture retailer HOM Furniture, and printers/publishers John Roberts Company and ECM Publishers.

Largest employers
According to the City's 2014 Comprehensive Annual Financial Report, the city's largest employers are:

Government
The city of Coon Rapids has a non-partisan council–manager form of government, and its current mayor is Jerry Koch. The city is divided into 5 Wards, each represented on the City Council by their own Councilmember, with one at-Large Councilmember.

As of the 2022 election, Coon Rapids is represented in the State House by districts 35B (Peggy Scott, Republican), 35A (Zack Stephenson, Democrat), and 37A (Erin Koegel, Democrat); and in the State Senate by districts 35 (Jim Abeler, Republican), and 37 (Jerry Newton, Democrat).

Coon Rapids is located in Minnesota's 3rd congressional district, represented by Democrat Dean Phillips.

Mayors & Current Local Government
Since its incorporation as a city in 1952, Coon Rapids, Minnesota has had 15 Mayors:

The next mayoral election will take place in 2026.
As of the 2022 election, the current members of the Coon Rapids City Council are:

Education
The city is home to Anoka-Ramsey Community College, which offers a wide variety of 2- and 4-year programs. The college awarded 754 Associate degrees in 2013.

Coon Rapids is served by the Anoka-Hennepin Public School District 11. Coon Rapids High School is the largest school in the city, with enrollment of approximately 2800. Coon Rapids Middle School is also located in the city, sharing a parking lot with the high school. The private Catholic school, Epiphany, is another school that is within the city.

Cross of Christ Lutheran School is a Pre-K-8 grade school of the Wisconsin Evangelical Lutheran Synod in Coon Rapids. Northwest Passage High School is a highly rated charter school specializing in inquiry-driven project based learning, interdisciplinary seminars and expeditions.

In the 1980s the Minnesota Japanese School, a weekend supplementary school for Japanese people, formerly held its classes at the Coon Rapids campus, using eleven of its classrooms.

Demographics

2010 census
As of the census of 2010, there were 61,476 people, 23,532 households, and 16,323 families living in the city. The racial makeup of the city was 86.0% White, 5.5% African American, 0.7% Native American, 3.5% Asian, 1.2% from other races, and 3.1% from two or more races. Hispanic or Latino of any race were 3.2% of the population.

There were 23,532 households, of which 34.3% had children under the age of 18 living with them, 51.4% were married couples living together, 13.0% had a female householder with no husband present, 4.9% had a male householder with no wife present, and 30.6% were non-families. 23.8% of all households were made up of individuals, and 7.8% had someone living alone who was 65 years of age or older. The average household size was 2.60 and the average family size was 3.08.

The median age in the city was 36.9 years. 24.5% of residents were under the age of 18; 8.9% were between the ages of 18 and 24; 27.5% were from 25 to 44; 27.8% were from 45 to 64; and 11.3% were 65 years of age or older. The gender makeup of the city was 48.4% male and 51.6% female.

2000 census
As of the census of 2000, there were 61,627 people, 22,578 households, and 16,572 families living in the city. The racial makeup of the city was 93.22% White, 2.18% African American, 0.67% Native American, 1.60% Asian, 0.01% Pacific Islander, 0.59% from other races, and 1.73% from two or more races. Hispanic or Latino of any race were 1.51% of the population.

There were 22,578 households, out of which 39.1% had children under the age of 18 living with them, 57.3% were married couples living together, 12.2% had a female householder with no husband present, and 26.6% were non-families. 20.1% of all households were made up of individuals, and 5.1% had someone living alone who was 65 years of age or older.  The average household size was 2.71 and the average family size was 3.15.

In the city, the population was spread out, with 28.7% under the age of 18, 8.9% from 18 to 24, 33.3% from 25 to 44, 21.7% from 45 to 64, and 7.3% who were 65 years of age or older.  The median age was 33 years. For every 100 females, there were 94.8 males.  For every 100 females age 18 and over, there were 91.5 males.

The median income for a household in the city was $55,550, and the median income for a family was $62,260. Males had a median income of $41,195 versus $30,277 for females. The per capita income for the city was $22,915.  About 3.6% of families and 4.8% of the population were below the poverty line, including 6.6% of those under age 18 and 6.1% of those age 65 or over.

References

External links

 City of Coon Rapids official website

Cities in Minnesota
Minnesota populated places on the Mississippi River
Cities in Anoka County, Minnesota
Populated places established in 1857
1857 establishments in Minnesota Territory